Johannpeter is a surname. Notable people with the surname include:

 André Bier Gerdau Johannpeter (born 1963), Brazilian businessman and equestrian
 Jorge Gerdau Johannpeter (born 1936), Brazilian businessman and equestrian

See also 
 Asteroid 19970 Johannpeter, named after Johann Peter Hebel (1760–1826)